Earth Passage – Density is an album by American jazz saxophonist Joseph Jarman and percussionist Don Moye featuring Craig Harris and Rafael Garrett recorded in 1981 for the Italian Black Saint label.

Reception
The Allmusic review by Scott Yanow awarded the album 4 stars stating "Four advanced improvisers team up to play complex and rather open-ended originals during this adventurous set".

Track listing
All compositions by Joseph Jarman except as indicated
 "Zulu Village: Hommage/Summoning the Elders/Children's Sun Celebration" (Joseph Jarman, Don Moye) - 13:02 
 "Happiness Is" - 10:09 
 "Jawara" (Craig Harris) - 12:09 
 "Sun Spots" - 10:57 
Recorded at Barigozzi Studio in Milano, Italy on  February 16 & 17, 1981

Personnel
Joseph Jarman - soprano saxophone, alto saxophone,  tenor saxophone, C melody saxophone, piccolo, flute, bamboo flute, alto clarinet, bass clarinet
Famoudou Don Moye - Sun percussion
Craig Harris - trombone, bamboo flute, didgeridoo, cowbell, voice
Rafael Garrett - bass, bamboo flute, conch shell, panpipes

References

Black Saint/Soul Note albums
Don Moye albums
Joseph Jarman albums
1981 albums